The Dick Howser Trophy is bestowed annually to the national college baseball player of the year. The award is named after former collegiate and Major League Baseball (MLB) player and manager Dick Howser, who died of brain cancer in 1987 at the age of 51. In that same year, the award was established by friends of Howser and presented to Mike Fiore, the inaugural winner. It is considered to be the Heisman Trophy of college baseball.

Six winners of the Dick Howser Trophy are members of the National College Baseball Hall of Fame.  Four winners—Kris Benson, David Price, Stephen Strasburg, and Adley Rutschman—went on to become the first overall MLB draft pick. Jason Jennings, Buster Posey, and Kris Bryant went on to win the Rookie of the Year Award several years after winning the Dick Howser Trophy. Jered Weaver is the only award winner to pitch a no-hitter, while Mark Teixeira holds the record for most games with home runs from both sides of the plate. Furthermore, seventeen players won the Golden Spikes Award alongside the Dick Howser Trophy. Brooks Kieschnick is the only player to win the trophy more than once.

The winners from 1987 to 1998 were selected by the American Baseball Coaches Association (ABCA). The National Collegiate Baseball Writers Association (NCBWA) became the voting body in 1999, and now presents the award together with the St. Petersburg Chamber of Commerce in Florida. The most recent recipient of the award is Ivan Melendez of Texas.

Winners

See also

List of college baseball awards
College baseball awards in the United States

Notes

References
General

Specific

External links
National Collegiate Baseball Writers Association (NCBWA) official website
College Baseball Foundation official website
American Baseball Coaches Association (ABCA) official website

College baseball player of the year awards in the United States
Awards established in 1987